Brian Gordon Evans (born 23 May 1964, in Preston, Lancashire, England, United Kingdom) is an English cricketer. He was educated at St Chad's College, Durham University. He captained the Durham University XI (1985) and was a member of the university squad 1984–1990. He played for Hertfordshire from 1983–1991 as a right-hand batsman, appearing in four "List A" one-day matches. He also played for Middlesex and Gloucestershire (2nd XIs).

References
Cricinfo profile

1964 births
Living people
English cricketers
Alumni of St Chad's College, Durham
Hertfordshire cricketers